Juan Montoya (born 22 November 1932) is a Guatemalan cyclist. He competed in the 4,000 metres team pursuit at the 1952 Summer Olympics.

References

1932 births
Living people
Guatemalan male cyclists
Olympic cyclists of Guatemala
Cyclists at the 1952 Summer Olympics